Thunderbird (John Proudstar) is a fictional superhero appearing in American comic books published by Marvel Comics. Created by writer Len Wein and artist Dave Cockrum, the character first appears in Giant-Size X-Men #1 (May 1975). Thunderbird was a short-lived member of the Second Genesis group of X-Men gathered together in this issue, as he died on their second mission.

An Apache Native American and Human Mutant, John Proudstar possesses superhuman athletic ability. Since his death, the character has been temporarily brought back to life in the Necrosha and Chaos War storylines. His brother, James Proudstar, known first as Thunderbird, and then as Warpath, is also a mutant and X-Men with similar capabilities.

In addition to his mainstream incarnations, Thunderbird has been depicted in other fictional universes. The most notable alternative version of the character is a member of the original Exiles team. In other media, Thunderbird is one of the main characters adapted to the live-action television series The Gifted, which debuted in 2017, portrayed by the actor Blair Redford.

Publication history
Writer Len Wein and artist Dave Cockrum created Thunderbird for the new X-Men, specifically to be a member of the team who would fail the entrance exam. Having already decided that the previously introduced characters Sunfire and Banshee would fail the exam, Wein and Cockrum felt it would be unrealistic for only older characters to "flunk out", and set about creating a new character to fit this role. After developing Thunderbird, however, they decided that they liked the character — his costume in particular — too much to write him off after only one issue, and decided to keep him on.

The character debuted in Giant-Size X-Men #1 (May 1975). While working on the first issues of the regular series, the creative team realized that having Thunderbird as a regular character was problematic. According to Cockrum, "...we created him as an obnoxious loudmouth, and we already had an obnoxious loudmouth in Wolverine. So one of us decided to kill him off after all, just for shock value." Chris Claremont, who scripted the story, confirms that it was Wein who decided to kill the character, and added, "He figured there are two ways to do this. One, you spend years, if not decades, building up a relationship between the audience and a character, building the emotional bonds between them so when something happens to that character the audience is devastated. Or you do it right off the bat, when no one is expecting it." The story culminating in Thunderbird's death appeared in X-Men #94-95.

In 2000, for the 25th anniversary of the introduction of Thunderbird, writer Scott Lobdell and artist Aaron Lopresti did a two-issue series about the character, with a cover by Art Adams. Marvel Comics never published the series. At the same period, after nine years of absence, Chris Claremont returned to the X-Men to take over the titles. According to Brian Cronin from Comic Book Resources, there were likely two events that lead to the cancellation of this mini-series. Firstly, Claremont introduced a new X-Man character Neal Shaara with the codename Thunderbird. Secondly, Claremont had his own project for the 25th anniversary: X-Men: Black Sun, which had a spotlight comic on the various members of the All-New, All-Different X-Men, including one on Thunderbird with his partner Wolverine.

In 2010, the character appeared in the front of a teaser featuring X-Men characters believed to be dead titled "All New, All Different". Thunderbird was one of the feature characters in the 2011 two-issue limited series Chaos War: X-Men.

Fictional character biography

Origins
John Proudstar was born into an Apache tribe on a reservation in Camp Verde, Arizona. As a teenager, he discovered he possessed the mutant abilities of superhuman senses, strength, speed, stamina, and sturdiness.

Proudstar was drafted into the United States Marine Corps during the Vietnam War and earned the rank of corporal. He returned to his tribe after the war, but he was unhappy and listless.

He was then recruited by Professor Charles Xavier to join his third group of X-Men. Eager to prove his prowess, Proudstar agreed and assumed the superhero codename Thunderbird. He assisted the other X-Men in rescuing the original X-Men from Krakoa the mutant island.

During the weeks of training that followed, the ill-tempered and individualistic Thunderbird often found himself going head to head with the X-Men's leader Cyclops. The new team's second mission took them to Valhalla Base, Colorado, to combat Count Nefaria and the Ani-Men. When Nefaria attempted to make his escape in a jet plane, Proudstar leapt on board. Disregarding Professor X's orders to jump to safety, Thunderbird hammered at it with his bare fists. The plane exploded, killing Proudstar. Count Nefaria is later revealed to have survived the crash.

Thunderbird's brother James Proudstar has similar powers, although to a much greater degree. He is also an X-Man who first used the codename Thunderbird then switched to Warpath when he joined X-Force team.

When Warpath goes to visit Thunderbird's grave during the Necrosha storyline, he encounters the Demon Bear. After defeating the creature, with the aid of Ghost Rider, he learns that former Purifier Eli Bard has dug up Thunderbird and everyone else buried there. It is revealed that Bard used a version of the Technarch virus to resurrect Thunderbird and the others as his servants. Thunderbird is later seen with Selene's Inner Circle and Caliban being led to the ruins of Genosha, which she dubs Necrosha. Thunderbird fights Warpath, who snaps his neck and then kills Selene. Thunderbird's spirit is seen departing, telling his brother that he "can let go now".

During the "Chaos War" storyline, Thunderbird is among the fallen X-Men members (along with Banshee, Moira MacTaggert, Esme and Sophie of the Stepford Cuckoos, and three deceased dupes of Multiple Man) to return from the dead after what happened to the death realms. He remembers the last time he was revived briefly during the events of Necrosha, albeit faintly. Thunderbird leads the revived X-Men members to looking for a diary written by Destiny that might hold the key to defeating Amatsu-Mikaboshi while evading Carrion Crow, Eater of the Dead. Thunderbird called upon the mythical Thunderbird to get him and his group away from the Carrion Crow. He and the group discover that Moira MacTaggert has been possessed by Destiny's ghost. In the aftermath of the defeat of the Chaos King, Thunderbird is returned to the afterlife after reality is restored by Hercules. Thunderbird contemplates that his life finally means something and hopes that next time he was resurrected, it will be with Sophie.

When the X-Men made Krakoa a mutant paradise, the resurrection protocols brought back many dead mutants including Thunderbird. He was seen at The Green Lagoon watching Dazzler's concert. However, his resurrection is explicitly shown on-panel in the concluding chapter of the Trial of Magneto arc (during Reign of X) as a consequence of the Scarlet Witch's magic.

Powers and abilities
Thunderbird is a mutant who possesses superhuman strength (sufficient to rip apart a fighter jet with his bare hands), speed (he is fast enough to outrun a bison, possibly much faster), and stamina due to his dense musculature. His senses are also enhanced, enabling him to be a highly adept tracker.

Thunderbird has military training in hand-to-hand combat.

Analysis
In Native Americans in Comic Books - A Critical Study, Michael A. Sheyahshe compared John Proudstar to Tupac Shakur, noting that "Thunderbird becomes even more popular, posthumously, than he ever was while living."

In September 2001, Bill Rosemann, the marketing communications manager of Marvel Comics, announced that "The death of Thunderbird!", Uncanny X-Men #95 had been classed number 32 in the 100 best Marvel Comics.

Reception
 In 2014, Entertainment Weekly ranked Thunderbird and Warpath 62nd in their "Let's rank every X-Man ever" list.

Other versions

Age of Apocalypse
In the Age of Apocalypse universe, John Proudstar is at the head of the religious group Ghost Dance whose members perform nightly dances asking the ancient spirits to bring an end to Apocalypse's reign. They also provided safe passage to Avalon through the Infernal Gallop. When Nightcrawler had the mission to travel to Avalon and bring back the mutant known as Destiny, he forced Proudstar to provide them passage. Betrayed by Danielle Moonstar, the Madri learned of  Proudstar and the Infernal Gallop's location at Ghost Dance. The Madri soldiers killed all the members of Ghost Dance.

Earth X
In the Earth X reality, John Proudstar's life is very similar. Thunderbird is seen in the Realm of the Dead talking with Professor X both believing they are still alive.

Exiles
An alternate version of John Proudstar is an original member of the Exiles, a group of superhumans tasked with fixing damaged realities. This Thunderbird is captured by Apocalypse during his time with the X-Men and unwillingly transformed into one of his Four Horsemen, namely War.

Thunderbird's time with this group is relatively short, several months at most. He serves mainly as the powerhouse of the group. In the third story arc, he meets another alternate version of himself, who has become the shaman of Alpha Flight, and this arc is largely centered on his internal conflicts. Later, Thunderbird sacrifices himself to hold an anti-matter bomb within the body of Galactus, which forces the world-devourer to leave Earth after the massive injury the bomb causes. Although his physical body heals from the damage caused by the detonation, he is left in a coma. He is replaced by Sasquatch and the team are forced to leave him behind. His body is later discovered in the Panoptichron, a crystal city that lies between realities, but has yet to be returned to his home reality.

During his time with the Exiles, he develops a romantic relationship with teammate Nocturne, who is pregnant with his child when he becomes comatose. (However, she later loses the child for unexplained reasons.) Issue #16 shows flashbacks of previously unseen scenes between the two characters that further develop their relationship.

This version of Thunderbird is considerably more powerful than the mainstream one, due to Apocalypse's augmentations. His skin is covered by retractable armor plates that harden when he enters battle, considerably increasing his durability, and even at the base level, his power statistics are above his main continuity counterpart. His power increases with his rage, akin to the Hulk who he once defeated in close combat, and his appearance becomes more bestial as he does so.

A side-effect of Apocalypse's modifications is that Thunderbird no longer has a sense of taste. He nevertheless enjoys smelling things.

Thunderbird wakes up and escapes the stasis wall in the Panoptichron. He helps Psylocke and Cat regain control of the Panoptichron during Doctor Doom's assault, and is later reunited with Nocturne when the Exiles and New Excalibur team up to save Roma and the Captain Britain Corps. Thunderbird leaves the team shortly after to be with Nocturne on Heather's earth.

House of M
In the House of M reality, John Proudstar appears as a police detective for the New York Police Department and as the leader of the strike force known as the "Brotherhood." Proudstar eventually made a deal with Wilson Fisk to bring in Luke Cage's gang as both a matter of pride and to end his criminal activities. Thunderbird's efforts resulted in Cage's Avengers battling the Brotherhood, in which their defeat caused Magneto to disband it.

What If?
Alternate versions of the character are present in some issues of What If? which is a series of comic books whose stories explore how the Marvel Universe might have unfolded if key moments in its history had not occurred as they did in mainstream continuity.

 In "What If the X-Men Died on their First Mission?," Thunderbird was among the original line-up that died when Krakoa was hurtled into space.
 In "What If Professor X Become the Juggernaut?," Thunderbird was part of Juggernaut's X-Men.
 In "What If an All-New All-Different X-Men Never Existed?," Thunderbird was never recruited by Professor X and was allied with Erik the Red. He was quickly frozen by Iceman.

In other media

Television
 Thunderbird appears in the Spider-Man and His Amazing Friends episode "The X-Men Adventure", voiced by John Stephenson. This version is a member of the X-Men who possesses the ability to shapeshift into a variety of North American animals instead of his comic book abilities.
 Thunderbird makes non-speaking appearances in X-Men: The Animated Series. In the opening sequence, he appears as a member of Magneto's Brotherhood of Evil Mutants, a decision made by series producers Larry F. Houston and Will Meugniot, who sought to find equilibrium between the X-Men and their adversaries. In the episode "Slave Island", Thunderbird makes a non-speaking cameo appearance as a resident of Genosha. In the book Previously on X-Men: The Making of an Animated Series, series showrunner Eric Lewald explained that Thunderbird was originally intended to die in the opening episodes to reflect his death in All-New, All-Different X-Men. However, it was decided that he would be replaced with Kevin Sydney / Morph, who seemingly dies in the two-part pilot "Night of the Sentinels" and resurfaces alive in later episodes.
 Thunderbird appears in The Gifted, portrayed by Blair Redford. This version is the leader of the Mutant Underground who was previously in a relationship with  Dreamer and eventually goes on to enter a relationship with Blink.

Miscellaneous
Thunderbird received a bust from Dynamic Forces in 2003.

Notes and references

Comic books
w: writer, p: penciler, i: inker

References

External links
 
 Thunderbird (John Proudstar) at Marvel Wiki
 
 Spotlight on Thunderbird I at UncannyXmen.net

Characters created by Dave Cockrum
Characters created by Len Wein
Comics characters introduced in 1975
Fictional Apache people
Fictional characters from Arizona
Fictional United States Marine Corps personnel
Fictional Vietnam War veterans
Marvel Comics characters who can move at superhuman speeds
Marvel Comics characters with superhuman strength
Marvel Comics male superheroes
Marvel Comics military personnel
Marvel Comics mutants
X-Men members